John Charles Fiala (born November 25, 1973) is a former American football linebacker who played from 1998-2002 with the Pittsburgh Steelers of the National Football League.

Fiala attended Lake Washington High School in Kirkland, Washington, and then the University of Washington. He was drafted by the Miami Dolphins in the sixth round of the 1997 NFL Draft, but did not play for the Dolphins.  Fiala signed with the Steelers as a free agent in 1998.  From 1999-2002, he was a special teams captain for the Steelers.  The Steelers released Fiala in 2002; although the Houston Texans offered him a contract for 2003, he chose to retire instead.

References

External links

 John Fiala statistics at databasefootball.com

1973 births
Living people
Sportspeople from Fullerton, California
Sportspeople from Kirkland, Washington
Players of American football from Washington (state)
American football linebackers
Washington Huskies football players
Pittsburgh Steelers players